2002–03 Bosnia and Herzegovina Football Cup was the ninth season of the Bosnia and Herzegovina's annual football cup, and a third season of the unified competition. The competition started on 6 November 2002 with the First Round and concluded on 27 May 2003 with the Final.

First round
Thirty-two teams entered in the First Round. The first legs were played on 6 November and the second legs were played on 10 November 2002.

|}

Second round
The 16 winners from the prior round enter this round. The first legs were played on 27 November and the second legs were played on 30 November 2002.
 

|}

Quarterfinals
The eight winners from the prior round enter this round. The first legs were played on 15 February and the second legs were played on 5 March 2003.

|}

Semifinals
The four winners from the prior round enter this round. The first legs will be played on 19 March and the second legs were played on 9 April 2003.

|}

Final

First leg

Second leg

Željezničar won 2–0 on aggregate.

See also
 2002–03 Premier League of Bosnia and Herzegovina

Notes

External links
Statistics on RSSSF

Bosnia and Herzegovina Football Cup seasons
Cup
Bosnia